Lucien Jerome Fenton (May 7, 1844 – June 28, 1922) was an American Civil War veteran who served two term as a U.S. Representative from Ohio from 1895 to 1899.

Biography 
Born in Winchester, Ohio, Fenton attended the public schools, National Normal University, Lebanon, Ohio, and Ohio University at Athens.
Enlisted as a private in Company I, Ninety-first Regiment, Ohio Volunteer Infantry, August 11, 1862.
He was discharged because of wounds on May 29, 1865.

Career
He taught school from 1865 to 1881.
He was an unsuccessful candidate for clerk of the courts of Adams County in 1880.
He served as clerk in the United States Treasury Department, Washington, D.C. from 1881 to 1884.
He returned to Ohio and organized the Winchester Bank in 1884.
He was appointed a trustee of the Ohio University at Athens by Governor McKinley in 1892.
He served as delegate to the Republican National Convention in 1892.

Congress 
Fenton was elected as a Republican to the Fifty-fourth and Fifty-fifth Congresses (March 4, 1895 – March 3, 1899).
He was an unsuccessful candidate for renomination in 1898.

Death
He resumed banking in Winchester, Ohio.
He served as president of the Winchester School Board 1912-1922.
He served as president of the Adams County School Board 1918-1922.

Death
He died in Winchester, Ohio, June 28, 1922.
He was interred in Winchester Cemetery.

Sources

1844 births
1922 deaths
People from Adams County, Ohio
Ohio University alumni
Ohio University trustees
National Normal University alumni
People of Ohio in the American Civil War
Union Army soldiers
School board members in Ohio
Republican Party members of the United States House of Representatives from Ohio